Tika Bhandari is a Nepalese song composer and singer of Nepali music. He has composed music for over 500 Nepali modern songs and has released a total of 23 music albums. He is best known for composing songs like Goli Sishako, Khusi Ta Kahan (Deep Shrestha), Kina Dukcha Timro Man (Prem Dhoj Pradhan), Yo Maya Bhanne Chij (Anju Panta) Gaule, Jo Desh Lai (Kiran Pradhan), Ma Sabda Charera (Deepak Kharel), Chanchale Timra (Rabin Sharma), Chiso Chiso Sun Koshi (Kumar Kancha), Hamro Prem ko Katha (Karna Das), Harka Jeet (Tika Bhandari, Rajesh Payal Rai), Chhati Bhitra Dhuk Dhuki (Tika Bhandari), Qatar Gaye Suadi Gaye (Dekendra Thapa), Aadha Bato (Swarup Raj), Barsat ma uni rujhda (Ram Krishna Dhakal), Sagarmatha Roi Rahechha(Ram Krishna Dhakal), Gangalal ko Jasto mutu (Shiva Pariyar), Timro Man Bata (Pramod Kharel), Ma ta hajur van ko driver (Udit Narayan Jha), Jhilimili Gaun Gharai Ramailo (Deepa Narayan Jha), Ko Sanga Chaina Afno Simana (Mohammed Aziz) etc. Most of the Nepalese singers have sung his compositions. He received Nepal Bidhya Bhusan in 2003 for being faculty topper in M.A. in Political Science from Tribhuvan University. He is also the Deputy Director of Radio Nepal. On 19 May 2016, he participated an environmental song by 365 Nepali artists lyrics and music by Nipesh Dhaka, in entitled Melancholy which set a Guinness World Records.

Awards and recognitions 
Tika Bhandari has been awarded several national honours. including Suprabal Janasewashri Chaturtha, Chhinnalata Sangeet puraskaar -2074, Natikaji Uwa Sangeet Puraskar- 2074, Best Music Composer Award Radio Nepal- 1999

Music awards 
 Narayan Gopal National Yuba Sangeet Puraskar – 2003
 Best Music Composer Award, Radio Nepal – 2000 
 Ten Youth Outstanding National Award (TYON) with medal – Nepal Jaycees – 2002
 Best Music Composer Radio Nepal – Nationwide Children Song Competition – 1998 AD

Educational awards 
 Mahendra Bidhya bhusan (Now Nepal Bidhya Bhusan), State Medal by former king Gyanendra Bir Bikram Shah Dev – 2003
 Badakaji Marichman Singh Pradhan University Gold Medal – from Tribhuvan University, Nepal – 2003
 Lalitchand University Gold Medal from Tribhuvan University, Nepal – 2003

Albums 
He has worked with various lyricists and singers in more than 23 different musical albums and 4 dozen retail albums.

As a composer 
 Pratham Bhet with various artists – 2049 BS
 Nauli with singer Rekha Sharma – 2061 BS
 Abhilekh with lyricist Yubaraj Poudel – 2061 BS
 Gantabya with lyricist Prakash Kuikel – 2063 BS
 Aadha baato with Hemanat Pardeshi- 2066 BS
 Palpal with Surya Khatri Ghayal – 2070 BS
 Madan, Dedicated to people's leader Madan Bhandari (Music Composition) – 2071 BS
 Pardesh with lyricist Gyanendra Gadal – 2006 AD
 Kunai din with lyricist Shekhar Dhungel – 2008 AD
 Abhipsha with lyricist Bhupendra Mahat  – 2010 AD
 Ek anjuli maya with lyricist Deepak Jadit  – 2009 AD
 Parikalpana with lyricist Chandra Parsai Bibash  – 2007 AD
 Itihas with lyricist Min Bahadur Thapa – 2014 AD
 Mayako Sahar with lyricist Ishwar Prabasi – 2015 AD
 Rojai with singers Narad Dahal and Teken Dahal – 2015 AD
 Best of Tika Bhandari music collection – 2015 AD
 Desh – patriotic songs collection – 2015 AD

As a music director in Nepali films 
 Madahosh – 2054 BS
 Bihani – 2055 BS
 Bahadur – 2055 BS
 Gaule – 2056 BS
 Pardeshi Kancha – 2056 BS
 Jeet – 2056 BS 
 Majdur – 2057 BS
 Bhai – 2057 BS
 Lakshuman Rekha – 2057 BS 
 Natedar – 2058 BS 
 Pinjada – 2059 BS
 Santan Ko Maya – 2059 BS
 Jiwan Dan – 2059 BS
 Hamro Jindagi – 2059 BS 
 Baksis – 2059 BS

As a singer 
 Nepal Jatra Parody – 2058 BS
 Kurshi Jatra Parody – 2059 BS
 Swar Sangeet – 2015 AD
 Madan – 2015 AD
 Parody remix – 2015 AD
 Melancholy – 19 May 2016, An environmental song by 365 Nepali Artists, Guinness World Records.

References

Nepalese musicians
1964 births
Living people
People from Jhapa District